Carmichaelia glabrescens is a species of plant in the family Fabaceae. It is found only in New Zealand.

It was first described by Donald Petrie in 1921.

In 2006 using IUCN2.3 criteria it was declared "Near threatened", but in 2018 was declared "not threatened" under the New Zealand Threat Classification System.

References

glabrescens
Flora of New Zealand
Near threatened plants
Taxonomy articles created by Polbot
Plants described in 1921
Taxobox binomials not recognized by IUCN